Imatra is a town and municipality in southeastern Finland. Imatra is dominated by Lake Saimaa, the Vuoksi River and the border with Russia. Imatra belongs to the administrative province of Southern Finland and the region of South Karelia.

The main employers are pulp and paper manufacturer Stora Enso Oyj, the Town of Imatra, engineering steel manufacturer Ovako Bar Oy Ab, and the Finnish Border Guard.
, the total number of employees was 12,423. , 1,868 employees were employed by the Town of Imatra. The town manager of Imatra is Ari Lindeman. The town's nicknames include Imis, Ibiza and Nahkalippis City (Leather Baseball Cap City). Because of the location near the border, Russian tourists are a common sight in the town, and Russian tourism greatly benefits the local business life. Most people shop at Imatra, and Imatra's tax-free sales are the third largest among Finnish cities (only Helsinki and Lappeenranta are ahead).

The name of Imatra is believed to have originated from a Pre-Finno-Ugric substrate language. The lightning symbols on Imatra's coat of arms refer to the power plants that were started to be built in the early 1920s in both Tainionskoski and Imatrankoski rapids. The Ministry of the Interior approved the coat of arms for use on October 25 of the same year.

History
An Art Nouveau or Jugend style castle, currently known as Imatran Valtionhotelli (Imatra State Hotel), was built near the rapids in 1903 as a hotel for tourists from the Russian Imperial capital Saint Petersburg.

During the Continuation War, Carl Gustaf Emil Mannerheim met with Adolf Hitler in secrecy near the town for the former's 75th birthday.

Imatra was founded in 1948 on the territory of three municipalities – Jääski, Ruokolahti and Joutseno. Finland ceded 9% of its territory to the Soviet Union after the Winter War. Jääski lost 85% of its territory and it was decided that a new municipality, Imatra, should be established on the remaining 15% of Jääski and some areas of Ruokolahti and Joutseno. This is why the Imatra coat of arms has three flashes – in honour of those previous municipalities that granted areas to it. It gained its municipal charter in 1971.

Sport
PaSa Bandy is a bandy club in Imatra.

Imatra is the birthplace of National Hockey League players Jussi Markkanen and Petteri Nokelainen.

In motorsport history, Imatra is best known for its road races (former TT-race) from 1963 to 1986. From 1962 to 1982 it was the home of the Finnish motorcycle Grand Prix. Racing on the Imatra road circuit ended after fatal accident during the 1986 European Championship event. Racing resumed in 2016 as an International Road Racing Championship event.

There is an annual indoor rowing race at Imatra, which attracts competitors from across Finland.

Transport 

The national road 6, running from Koskenkylä in Loviisa to Kajaani via Kouvola, Lappeenranta, and Joensuu passes through Imatra. Also in Imatra is a crossing point over the Russian border, which is also the ending point of primary road 62 from Mikkeli.

The Kouvola–Joensuu railway passes through Imatra, and the Imatra railway station serves both passenger and freight transport. From the rail yard of this station is a fork onto the railway towards Kamennogorsk via Vyborg. The planning of the initiation of regular international passenger traffic between Imatra and Saint Petersburg is currently underway.

The closest airport to Imatra is the Lappeenranta Airport, which is used by Ryanair on several routes as well as irregular passenger flights to the Canary Islands and cargo flights to Russia. The Immola Airfield is also present, serving the Finnish Border Guard as well as hobbyist aviation activities.

Notable people 
 Marlo Koponen, ice hockey player
 Jarmo Koski, actor
 Arvo Kyllönen, wrestler
 Jussi Markkanen, ice hockey player
 Petteri Nokelainen, ice hockey player
 Lilli Paasikivi, artistic director
 Jouni Pellinen, skier
 Jarmo Sandelin, professional golfer
 Anneli Taina, politician
 Taiska, singer

International relations

Twin towns:
  Ludvika, Sweden 
  Salzgitter, Germany 
  Zvolen, Slovakia 
  Tikhvin, Russia (frozen since 2022 due to Russia attacking Ukraine) 
  Szigetvár, Hungary 
  Narva-Jõesuu, Estonia
  Jiaxing, China

Sister cities:
  Beihai, China

Co-operation cities:
  Nizhyn, Ukraine

Gallery

See also 
 Imatra shooting
 Svetogorsk

References

External links 

Town of Imatra – Official site
goSaimaa.com – Travel information about Imatra

 
Cities and towns in Finland
Populated places established in 1948
Finland–Russia border crossings